Pyrrha or Pyrra was a town of ancient Euboea.

Its site is unlocated.

References

Populated places in ancient Euboea
Former populated places in Greece
Lost ancient cities and towns